Lewis Gilbert  (6 March 1920 – 23 February 2018) was an English film director, producer and screenwriter who directed more than 40 films during six decades; among them such varied titles as Reach for the Sky (1956), Sink the Bismarck! (1960), Alfie (1966), Educating Rita (1983) and Shirley Valentine (1989), as well as three James Bond films: You Only Live Twice (1967), The Spy Who Loved Me (1977) and Moonraker (1979).

Early life
Lewis Gilbert was born as Louis Laurie Isaacs in Clapton, London, to a second-generation family of music hall performers, and spent his early years travelling with his parents, Ada (Griver), who was of Jewish descent, and George Gilbert, and watching the shows from the wings. He first performed on stage at the age of five, when asked to drive a trick car around the stage. This pleased the audience, so this became the finale of his parents' act. When travelling on trains, his parents frequently hid him in the luggage rack, to avoid paying a fare for him. His father contracted tuberculosis as a young man and died aged 34, when Gilbert was seven.

As a child actor in films in the 1920s and 1930s, he was the breadwinner for his family. His mother was a film extra, and he had an erratic formal education. In 1933, at the age of 13, he had a role in Victor Hanbury and John Stafford's Dick Turpin, and at age 17 a small uncredited role in The Divorce of Lady X (1938) opposite Laurence Olivier. Alexander Korda offered to send him to RADA, but Gilbert chose to study direction instead, assisting Alfred Hitchcock's Jamaica Inn (1939).

When the Second World War started, he joined the Royal Air Force's film unit, where he worked on various documentary films. He was eventually seconded to the First Motion Picture Unit of the U.S. Army Air Forces, where his commanding officer was William Keighley, an American film director, who allowed Gilbert to take on much of his film-making work.

Directorial career
After the war, he continued to write and direct documentary shorts for Gaumont British, before entering low budget feature film production. Gilbert made his name as a director in the 1950s and 1960s with a series of successful films, often working as the film's writer and producer as well. These films were often based on true stories from the Second World War. Examples include Reach for the Sky (1956) (based on the life of air ace Douglas Bader), Carve Her Name with Pride (1958) (the story of SOE agent Violette Szabo) and Sink the Bismarck! (1960).

Alfie
Gilbert directed Alfie (1966) starring Michael Caine. Gilbert's wife Hylda discovered the play by Bill Naughton when she visited the hair salon and sat next to an actress who was in a production. Upon seeing the play, Hylda urged Gilbert to make it into a film. Gilbert used the technique of having the lead character speak directly to the viewer, a technique he later also used in Shirley Valentine (1989). Gilbert said Alfie was only made because the low budget was "the sort of money Paramount executives normally spend on cigar bills". The film won the Jury Special Prize at the Cannes Film Festival, and was nominated for five Academy Awards including Best Picture. Gilbert was also nominated for a Golden Globe for Best Director.

In 1967, Gilbert was chosen to direct Lionel Bart's musical version of Oliver!, but he was already contracted to another project and had to pull out; he recommended Carol Reed, who took over. "It was the lowest point in my life," said Gilbert. "I'd developed Oliver! with Lionel Bart. I had to do The Adventurers instead... While doing this film, I signed to do The Godfather. Because of their financial problems, Paramount could only find $2m to make it. I said it needed $7m". So, instead, Gilbert made Friends (1971 movie).

James Bond
Although known for character dramas, Gilbert directed three of the James Bond films. After some reluctance, he was persuaded by Harry Saltzman and Albert R. Broccoli to direct You Only Live Twice (1967). He turned down the opportunity to direct On Her Majesty's Secret Service. Gilbert returned to the series in the 1970s to make The Spy Who Loved Me (1977) and Moonraker (1979). After the high production costs of Moonraker and the financial failure of Michael Cimino's Heaven's Gate, United Artists was unable to afford to hire him to direct the next Bond film For Your Eyes Only.

Later career
In the 1980s, he returned to more small-scale dramas with film versions of Willy Russell's plays Educating Rita (1983) and Shirley Valentine (1989). Gilbert also directed the film Stepping Out (1991).

Gilbert was appointed a Commander of the Order of the British Empire (CBE) in the 1997 Birthday Honours for services to the film industry. In 2001, Gilbert was made a Fellow of the British Film Institute, the highest accolade in the British film industry.

In June 2010, he appeared on the BBC Radio 4 programme Desert Island Discs. In it, he said that his 1970 film The Adventurers was a disaster, and that he should never have made it. On working with Orson Welles on Ferry to Hong Kong, he said that it was: "dreadful, it was my nightmare film. It was a dreadful film, and everything was wrong with it; principally him [Welles]." He also said that his biggest mistake was failing to direct the film version of the musical Oliver!. Its composer Lionel Bart had assured Gilbert that nobody else would do the film, but Gilbert was contractually committed to Paramount to make a film (that he has since refused to name), which caused him to withdraw from the project.

Personal life
Gilbert was married to Hylda Tafler for 53 years, until her death in June 2005. They had a son, Stephen, and raised another, John, hers from a prior relationship.

All My Flashbacks: The Autobiography of Lewis Gilbert, Sixty Years a Film Director was published by Reynolds & Hearn in 2010.

Gilbert died at home in Monaco on 23 February 2018, aged 97.

Filmography

References

External links
 Lewis Gilbert on Desert Island Discs 2010
 BFI film and TV credits for Lewis Gilbert Retrieved 14 April 2012
Lewis Gilbert at BAFTA

1920 births
2018 deaths
Action film directors
BAFTA Outstanding British Contribution to Cinema Award
Commanders of the Order of the British Empire
Filmmakers who won the Best Film BAFTA Award
English expatriates in Monaco
English film directors
English film producers
English male screenwriters
English people of Jewish descent
Royal Air Force personnel of World War II
Writers from London